The 2006 FIM Sidecarcross world championship, the 27th edition of the competition, started on 23 April and finished after eight race weekends on 17 September 2006 with Daniël Willemsen taking out the title once more.

Overview

The 2006 season was the 27th edition of the sidecarcross world championship. It resulted in a fifth world championship for Daniël Willemsen, his fourth in a row and the second with his passenger Sven Verbrugge from Belgium. The two clearly dominated the season with 13 wins in the 16 races and an 83-point gap to the second placed Evgeny Scherbinin / Sergei Sosnovskikh from Russia. A close third came Marco Happich / Meinrad Schelbert, the German-Swiss combination.

After ten seasons in the top ten and five world championships, it was the first time since 1995 for last season's runner-up Kristers Serģis not to finish in the top ten. Due to injury, the Latvian only took part in four races but still achieved three podium finishes.

The eight races of the season were held in six countries, France, Germany, Croatia, Belgium, Latvia and the Netherlands.

Format
Every Grand Prix weekend is split into two races, both held on the same day. This means, the 2006 season with its eight Grand Prix had sixteen races. Each race is currently 30 minutes plus 2 rounds long.

Teams go through a qualifying, usually on Saturday. Typically, around 50 teams compete for 30 spots on the starting grid, meaning around 20 teams miss out on the race altogether. Some teams did not actually get a race start all season, failing in qualifying each time.

The first twenty teams of each race scored competition points, allocated accordingly to the following system:

Retirements
At the end of the 2006 season a number of long-term competitors retired from the World Championship, the longest standing of those being German Josef Brustmann with 19 seasons in the competition and Belgian Geert Devoldere with 18 seasons, both first having raced in the World Championship in 1988.

Calendar
The 2006 season had sixteen races:

 The Sidecarcross des Nations in Ķegums on 24 September 2006 is a non-championship event but part of the calendar and is denoted by a light blue background in the table above.
 Passengers in italics.

Classification

Riders
The final standings in the overall table of the 2006 season were:

 Equipment listed is motor and frame.
 Marko Happichs only win of the season came with Mark Watson as passenger, who raced at the German GP with him.

References

External links
 The World Championship on Sidecarcross.com
 The John Davey Grand Prix Pages – Results of all GP's up until 2005
 FIM Sidecar Motocross World Championship 2010

Sidecarcross world championship, 2006
Sidecarcross World Championship seasons